Ashley Rebecca Parker (born September 18, 1982) is an American journalist, a White House reporter for The Washington Post, and senior political analyst for MSNBC. From 2011 to 2017 she was a Washington-based politics reporter for The New York Times.

Personal life 
Parker was born and raised in Bethesda, Maryland by Bruce and Betty Parker. Her father is a former president of Environmental Industries Association, a Washington, D.C. based trade organization. She has lived in Bethesda for the majority of her life, except during her college years and a few years while working for The New York Times. Her immediate family still resides in the area.

She married Michael C. Bender, who was at the time a White House reporter for The Wall Street Journal, on June 16, 2018.

Parker and her husband have a daughter, Mazarine, born in November 2018. Parker is stepmother to Bender's daughter from a previous marriage.

Education
Parker attended Bethesda's Walt Whitman High School, where she was a member of the class of 2001. She also spent part of her junior year at La Universidad de Sevilla in Spain and has a command of Spanish.

In 2005, she graduated summa cum laude from the University of Pennsylvania, where she majored in English (Creative Writing concentration) and Communications. She had been a Pulitz. Parker also completed internships with The New York Sun and the Gaithersburg Gazette, which is owned by The Washington Post. She served as a features editor and writer at both 34th Street Magazine and The Daily Pennsylvanian, the independent student newspaper for the University of Pennsylvania in Philadelphia.

Career
After college at the University of Pennsylvania, Parker interned at the Gaithersburg Gazette and reported on local government, including city planning meetings.

She worked as a researcher for Maureen Dowd, a columnist for The New York Times.

She appeared and continues to appear on Washington Week on PBS, and she has also written for The New York Times Magazine. 
She covers many Republican Party candidates, elected officials, and topics as well as 
covering routine New York City topics and the White House. She also covered Chelsea Clinton's wedding for The New York Times.

Parker's photographs have appeared in Vanity Fair and her writing has appeared in other publications including The New York Sun, Glamour, The Huffington Post, Washingtonian, Chicago Magazine and Life magazine.

She and her Post colleague Philip Rucker shared the 2017 Gerald R. Ford Journalism Prize for Distinguished Reporting on the Presidency.

She was part of the reporting team at The Washington Post that won the Pulitzer Prize for National Reporting in 2018 on coverage of Russian interference in the 2016 United States elections.

On September 7, 2019 Donald Trump called Parker in a tweet a "nasty lightweight reporter" and called for banning her from the White House.

On November 20, 2019, Parker co-moderated the fifth Democratic Party presidential debate of the 2020 campaign, along with Rachel Maddow, Andrea Mitchell, and Kristen Welker.

In January 2021, she became the Washington Post White House bureau chief.

On May 9, 2022, she was part of the Washington Post team that received the Pulitzer Prize for Public Service.

References

External links
 Ashley Parker author page at The Washington Post

1982 births
Pages with login required references or sources
The New York Times people
American newspaper reporters and correspondents
University of Pennsylvania alumni
Living people
MSNBC people
American television reporters and correspondents
People from Bethesda, Maryland
The Washington Post people
The Daily Pennsylvanian people
American women journalists
21st-century American journalists
21st-century American women writers
Walt Whitman High School (Maryland) alumni